Casasia ekmanii is a plant belonging to the family Rubiaceae, it is native to Haiti.

References

ekmanii